All for Two is a 2013 Danish action comedy film directed by Rasmus Heide. It is a sequel to All for One.

Cast 
 Jonatan Spang as Nikolai
 Rasmus Bjerg as Timo
 Mick Øgendahl as Ralf
 Kurt Ravn as Arno
 Kim Bodnia as William Lynge
 Stine Stengade as Therese
 Gordon Kennedy as Toke
 Lise Koefoed as Ane
 Laura Christensen as Fiona
 Martin Buch as John

References

External links 

2013 comedy films
2013 films
Danish comedy films
Danish sequel films
Films with screenplays by Anders Thomas Jensen
2010s Danish-language films